Farid Kharboutly (born 3 August 1953) is a Syrian sports shooter. He competed in the mixed skeet event at the 1992 Summer Olympics.

References

1953 births
Living people
Syrian male sport shooters
Olympic shooters of Syria
Shooters at the 1992 Summer Olympics
Sportspeople from Damascus